Brijesh Giri (born 7 January 2003) is an Indian professional footballer who plays as a defender for Indian Super League club ATK Mohun Bagan.

Club career
Born in Darjeeling, West Bengal, Giri made his professional debut for I-League side Indian Arrows on 14 January 2021 against Sudeva Delhi. He came on as a second-half stoppage time substitute as Indian Arrows were defeated 0–3.

Career statistics

Club

Honours
India U20
SAFF U-20 Championship: 2022

References

External links
Profile at the All India Football Federation website

2003 births
Living people
People from Darjeeling
Indian footballers
Association football defenders
Indian Arrows players
I-League players
Footballers from West Bengal
India youth international footballers